The 1907–08 Princeton Tigers men's ice hockey season was the 9th season of play for the program.

Season
After losing more than half of the championship roster to graduation it was unsurprising that the team took a step back in 1908. When Princeton headed into the winter break they did so with seven games on the slate. To help the team navigate its way through, two-year captain Afton Zaniser returned to coach the team. After a rough start the trip turned out remarkably well for the Tigers with the team winning three out of four in Cleveland. While the team had begun the season with Douglas Ballin in net they had found greater success when Peacock took over the role.

After the jam-packed schedule Princeton had little time to rest before beginning their conference schedule but still started with a win over Columbia. The Tigers weren't able to keep up with the remainder of the IHA, however, and lost their remaining conference games to finish in a tie for 3rd place. On a positive note, Princeton played its first true home game against Lawrenceville School, winning a weather-shortened match on Lake Carnegie.

Frederic Leake and Joshua Brush served as team managers.

Roster

Standings

Schedule and Results

|-
!colspan=12 style=";" | Regular Season

Note: MIT records a game against Princeton on February 6 as well.

Scoring Statistics

Note: Assists were not recorded as a statistic.

References

Princeton Tigers men's ice hockey seasons
Princeton
Princeton
Princeton
Princeton